The Tempietto di Santa Croce is a small octagonal Romanesque chapel found in the upper city of Bergamo, near the Santa Maria Maggiore. The original building was constructed in the first half of the 11th century, though first documentation of the structure dates to 1133.
Other Romanesque structures in the province include the  Rotonda di San Tomè, the Basilica di Santa Giulia, and the Priorato di Sant'Egidio.

References

External links
Hans Erich Kubach.  Architettura romanica. Milano, Electa, 1978. .
Jacques Le Goff. L'uomo medievale. Bari, Laterza, 1999. .
Gian Maria Labaa. San Tomè in Almenno. Studi, ricerche, interventi per il restauro di una chiesa romanica. Bergamo, Lubrina, 2005. .
Lorenzo Moris, Alessandro Pellegrini. Sulle tracce del romanico in provincia di Bergamo. Bergamo, Prov. Bergamo, 2003.
Raffaella Poggiani Keller, Filli Rossi, Jim Bishop. Carta archeologica della Lombardia: carta archeologica del territorio di Bergamo. Modena, Panini, 1992. .
Carlo Tosco.  Architetti e committenti nel romanico lombardo. Roma, Viella, 1997. .
 Antenna Europea del Romanico

Churches in Bergamo
Romanesque architecture in Lombardy
12th-century Roman Catholic church buildings in Italy
Octagonal churches in Italy